The 2017 Somalia presidential election was held in Somalia on 8 February. Members of parliament elected in the autumn-2016 parliamentary election elected former Prime Minister Mohamed Abdullahi Mohamed to the post of President of Somalia for a four-year term.

The presidential election was to be held in August 2016 and promised to be a one-person, one-vote national poll, but had been postponed several times and shifted to an electoral college system due to security concerns. On 26 January 2017, the election was set for 8 February, with candidates required to register by 29 January. The election was held in an airport hangar at Aden Adde International Airport, Mogadishu.

Mohamed was declared president in a peaceful transition of power after incumbent President Hassan Sheikh Mohamud conceded defeat and congratulated the victor.

Security
Due to the ongoing civil war, security for the ballot was a significant concern. The vote was initially planned to be held at a Mogadishu police academy but was moved to the more secure Aden Adde International Airport, considered as the safest place in Somalia's Capital. On the voting day, traffic was banned in the city, schools were closed and flights to and from the airport were suspended.

Electoral system
In the previous presidential election in 2012, the president was elected by a parliament that had been picked by 135 elders. Plans in 2016–2017 for a full election involving all adult Somalis were scrapped due to security concerns relating to the ongoing civil war. The election costs were 60% funded by donor countries in Europe, the United States and Japan, with the remainder from the Somali government and candidate registration fees.

The president was elected by the 328 members of the Lower House and Upper House of the Somali Parliament. The Parliament's members were elected in the 2016 parliamentary election which itself was limited to 14,025 clan elder-appointed delegates. The election's foreign financiers described the extension of the franchise as a "modest step forward".

The procedure for the election—a form of runoff voting—is outlined in section 89 of the Constitution of Somalia. There were over twenty registered candidates in the first round of voting.

Bribery 
The parliamentary election was considered by experts to be one of the most corrupt political events in the history of the country. Amid widespread reports of vote-buying, investigators estimated at least $20 million had been paid as bribes. Several candidates paid political unknowns to run against them to add a veneer of legitimacy to their races, and analysts have said that Al-Shabaab did not interfere with the election, as the corruption involved made the group look good by comparison. Much of the money used came from foreign nations with interests in Somalia, which hoped that the candidates they supported monetarily would help advance their interests. Once seated, the parliament voted on who would become president.

Candidates
A total of 23 or 24 candidates declared themselves, though withdrawals—including that of Abdirahman Farole—reduced the field to 21 by the time of the vote. The field included the incumbent President Hassan Sheikh Mohamud, incumbent Prime Minister Omar Sharmarke, former President Sharif Sheikh Ahmed, former Prime Minister Mohamed Abdullahi Mohamed and Somalia's former envoy to Kenya Mohamed Ali Nur among others.

Results

No candidate achieved the required two-thirds of votes to win in the first round, so the top four candidates (Hassan Sheikh Mohamud, Mohamed Abdullahi Mohamed, Sharif Sheikh Ahmed, and Omar Abdirashid Sharmarke) advanced to the second round. Omar Abdirashid Sharmarke then dropped out, reducing the field to three candidates. No candidate reached the required threshold in the second round of voting, and third-place Ahmed was eliminated. Hassan Sheikh Mohamud conceded defeat, negating the need for a final vote.

Mohamed became the President of Somalia after receiving 184 out of the total 329 votes by members of the Somali Parliament, thereby defeating former president Hassan Sheikh Mohamud. 
He ran against 19 opponents and was sworn into office on 16 February.

Notes

References

2017
2017 elections in Africa
2017 in Somalia
February 2017 events in Africa